Joseph Estey Macmanus (born 1953) is an American diplomat who served as Executive Secretary of the United States Department of State from 2014 to 2017. Prior to that, he served as the U.S. Ambassador to International Organizations in Vienna from 2012 to 2014, as well as interim coordinator for efforts to implement President Barack Obama's Iran Nuclear Deal in 2015. He was President Donald Trump's nominee to become United States Ambassador to Colombia. This nomination was reported favorably by the Senate Committee on Foreign Relations in May 2018, but was returned to the President at the close of the 115th Congress without consideration by the full Senate. In May 2019, it was announced that Philip Goldberg would replace Macmanus as nominee to be the next United States Ambassador to Colombia.

Career
Macmanus is a career foreign service officer, having entered the Foreign Service Institute in 1986. In his time at the State Department, he served as top aides to former Secretaries of State Condoleezza Rice and Hillary Clinton. He served as Deputy Assistant Secretary of State for Legislative Affairs from 2005 to 2008, and again from 2011 to 2012.

President Barack Obama appointed Macmanus to serve as U.S. Representative to the Vienna Office of the United Nations, as well as its representative to the International Atomic Energy Agency (IAEA) in December 2011. He came to international attention in 2013 when he accused Iran of deception at a meeting of the IAEA,
and then, with the Canadian, Australian and New Zealand envoys, stormed out of the meeting after Iran criticised Israel.

On November 29, 2017, President Donald Trump nominated Macmanus to serve as the United States Ambassador to Colombia. His nomination as Ambassador drew criticism from Senate Republicans who did not want President Trump to nominate someone who worked closely with former Secretary Hillary Clinton. In May 2019, it was announced that Philip Goldberg would replace Macmanus as nominee to be the next United States Ambassador to Colombia.

References

|-

|-

|-

|-

1953 births
Living people
Place of birth missing (living people)
University at Buffalo alumni
University of Notre Dame alumni
United States Assistant Secretaries of State
Ambassadors of the United States
Ambassadors of the United States to Colombia
Obama administration personnel
Representatives of the United States to the United Nations International Organizations in Vienna
United States Foreign Service personnel